Mark Cyril Smith (born 19 December 1961) is an English former footballer and manager.

Career
Smith played for Sheffield United, Worksop Town, Gainsborough Trinity, Scunthorpe United, Kettering Town, Rochdale, Huddersfield Town, Grimsby Town, Scunthorpe again, Boston United, Gainsborough again, Matlock Town, Sheffield, Hallam and Maltby Main.

He became manager of Buxton in the Northern Counties East Football League Premier Division during the 1999–2000 season. He resigned in April 2002. He was appointed as Maltby Main manager in July.

Notes

1961 births
Living people
Footballers from Sheffield
English footballers
Association football wingers
English Football League players
Sheffield United F.C. players
Worksop Town F.C. players
Gainsborough Trinity F.C. players
Scunthorpe United F.C. players
Kettering Town F.C. players
Rochdale A.F.C. players
Huddersfield Town A.F.C. players
Grimsby Town F.C. players
Boston United F.C. players
Matlock Town F.C. players
Sheffield F.C. players
Hallam F.C. players
Maltby Main F.C. players
English football managers
Buxton F.C. managers
Maltby Main F.C. managers